In differential geometry, the curvature form describes curvature of a connection on a principal bundle. The Riemann curvature tensor in Riemannian geometry can be considered as a special case.

Definition

Let G be a Lie group with Lie algebra , and P → B be a principal G-bundle.  Let ω be an Ehresmann connection on P (which is a -valued one-form on P). 

Then the curvature form is the -valued 2-form on P defined by

(In another convention, 1/2 does not appear.) Here  stands for exterior derivative,  is defined in the article "Lie algebra-valued form" and D denotes the exterior covariant derivative. In other terms,

where X, Y are tangent vectors to P.

There is also another expression for Ω: if X, Y are horizontal vector fields on P, then

A connection is said to be flat if its curvature vanishes: Ω = 0. Equivalently, a connection is flat if the structure group can be reduced to the same underlying group but with the discrete topology.

Curvature form in a vector bundle
If E → B is a vector bundle, then one can also think of ω as a matrix of 1-forms and the above formula becomes the structure equation of E. Cartan:

where  is the wedge product. More precisely, if  and  denote components of ω and Ω correspondingly, (so each  is a usual 1-form and each  is a usual 2-form) then

For example, for the tangent bundle of a Riemannian manifold, the structure group is O(n) and Ω is a 2-form with values in the Lie algebra of O(n), i.e. the antisymmetric matrices. In this case the form Ω is an alternative description of the curvature tensor, i.e.

using the standard notation for the Riemannian curvature tensor.

Bianchi identities

If  is the canonical vector-valued 1-form on the frame bundle, the torsion  of the connection form  is the vector-valued 2-form defined by the structure equation

where as above D denotes the exterior covariant derivative.

The first Bianchi identity takes the form

The second Bianchi identity takes the form

and is valid more generally for any connection in a principal bundle.

The Bianchi identities can be written in tensor notation as:

The contracted Bianchi identities are used to derive the Einstein tensor in the Einstein field equations, the bulk of general theory of relativity.

Notes

References
 Shoshichi Kobayashi and Katsumi Nomizu (1963) Foundations of Differential Geometry, Vol.I, Chapter 2.5 Curvature form and structure equation, p 75, Wiley Interscience.

See also

 Connection (principal bundle)
 Basic introduction to the mathematics of curved spacetime
 Contracted Bianchi identities
 Einstein tensor
 Einstein field equations
 General theory of relativity
 Chern-Simons form
 Curvature of Riemannian manifolds
 Gauge theory

Differential geometry
Curvature (mathematics)